Horr (also Romanized as Ḩorr; also known as Ḩorr-e Rīāḩī, Ḩorr-e Reyāḩī, Ḩāsheyeh Khalaf, Ḩāshīyeh Khalaf, and Ḩāshīyeh Sheykh Khalaf) is a city in the Central District of Shush County, Khuzestan Province, Iran.  At the 2006 census, its population was 7,839, in 1,390 families.

References

Populated places in Shush County

Cities in Khuzestan Province

az:Hürr Riyahi